The Blue Line is a light rail line in the system of mass transit in Dallas, Texas (USA), operated by the Dallas Area Rapid Transit system.

Route
The southern terminus of the line is currently at UNT Dallas in south Dallas at University Hills Blvd. just south of Camp Wisdom Rd.  The line runs north, under the Dallas Convention Center and through downtown Dallas.  After leaving Mockingbird, the line diverts to the northeast towards White Rock Lake.  The line then goes north and then east into Garland, finally ending in Rowlett.

History
The rail line was part of the initial launch of DART's light rail service in 1996.  At the time, the line only ran from Illinois to Pearl in the northeast corner of downtown.  In 1997, the Blue Line was extended south to Ledbetter and was extended along the Red Line to Mockingbird in 1999, in preparation for the future extension to Garland.

On September 24, 2001, the Blue Line extended to White Rock, just northwest of White Rock Lake.  On May 6, 2002, the Blue Line was extended to the LBJ/Skillman, just beyond LBJ Freeway (Interstate 635).  It was extended to Downtown Garland on November 18, 2002, and to its current northern terminus, Downtown Rowlett, on December 3, 2012.

DART's 2030 Transit System Plan, approved in October 2006, calls for the Blue Line to be extended south beyond Ledbetter to the University of North Texas at Dallas, as well as a branch along Bonnie View road to Interstate 20 and the SouthPort Intermodal Terminal.  The plan also includes a new Lake Highlands station near Skillman Street and Walnut Hill Lane, which opened as DART's second infill station in December 2010.

In October 2014, construction began for a 2.6-mile extension south from Ledbetter station to the University of North Texas at Dallas, adding two new stations to the line: Camp Wisdom and UNT Dallas. The extension opened for service on October 24, 2016.

Future plans
The D2 Subway is planned to be implemented in 2028 and will reroute the Blue Line off of the downtown transit corridor and over the former Green Line's western segment to terminate at North Carrollton/Frankford station.

Stations

Daily Service
Listed from north to south

Special Event Service
 Deep Ellum (Also served by )
 Baylor University Medical Center (Also served by )
 Fair Park (Also served by )
 Victory (Also served by)

Deferred
 Knox-Henderson Station in Uptown (Dallas)

Gallery

References

External links

 Map of the Blue Line (to scale)
 Full DART System Map

Dallas Area Rapid Transit light rail lines
Passenger rail transportation in Texas
Transportation in the Dallas–Fort Worth metroplex